The Fox Memorial is awarded to the premier club rugby league champions in the Auckland Rugby League. It was first awarded in 1931 and is named after Edward Vincent Fox who played for North Shore Albions, and represented Auckland in 1914. He fought in World War I and received leg injuries in 1916 which ended his playing career. The first ever grand final was played in 1958 between Ponsonby and Otahuhu. Prior to this the trophy was awarded to the team at the top of the standings from the regular season though occasionally a playoff was needed to decide the champion (for a list of these teams see below). The majority of the grand finals were played at Carlaw Park, but after the ground was vacated by Auckland Rugby League in the early 2000s the games have usually been played at Mt Smart Stadium.

Fox Memorial grand final appearances

Fox Memorial grand finals
 

 In 1964 the competition was reverting to its original composition with individual suburban clubs. Auckland Rugby League had enforced a district competition for several years with clubs merging to form teams geographically. As a result, there was a larger first division in 1964 and no final was played as a way of reintroducing the club competition.

References 

Rugby league in New Zealand
Grand finals